Alazar Aaron (also Romanized as Ojāq Ālāzār; also known as Alazar, Ālz̄ar, and Ojāq) is a village in Ojarud-e Markazi Rural District, in the Central District of Germi County, Ardabil Province, Iran. At the 2006 census, its population was 194, in 43 families.

References 

Towns and villages in Germi County